Asociación Deportiva Municipal Curridabat was a Costa Rican football club, that played a few seasons in the Primera División.

History
Founded in November 1979, Curridabat made it to the Segunda División in 1980 and won promotion to the Primera División in 1985. They played their first match in the top flight on 31 March 1985 against Sagrada Familia and played two seasons in the Primera División, in 1985 and 1987. The club later fell in decline and finally disappeared.

Honours

National
Segunda División de Costa Rica: 2
 1984, 1986

Players

Player Records

|-

Notable players

  Víctor Badilla
  Henry Duarte
  César Hines 
  Miguel Lacey (1987)
  Asdrúbal Paniagua (1985)
  Rolando Villalobos (1985)

Historical list of coaches

  Floyd Daniels (1985)
  Saddy Gutiérrez (1986)
  Juan José Gámez (1987)

References

Defunct football clubs in Costa Rica
Association football clubs established in 1979
1979 establishments in Costa Rica